{{Infobox person
| name               = 
| image              = Keir Dullea Denver Pyle 1962 (cropped).JPG
| caption            = Dullea in Kraft Mystery Theatres "Cry Ruin" (1962)
| birth_name         = Keir Atwood Dullea
| birth_date         = 
| birth_place        = Cleveland, Ohio, U.S.
| death_date         = 
| death_place        = 
| death_cause        = 
| resting_place      = 
| education          =
| occupation         = Actor
| yearsactive        = 1960–present
| spouse             =
}}Keir Atwood Dullea (born May 30, 1936) is an American actor. He played astronaut David Bowman in the 1968 film 2001: A Space Odyssey and its 1984 sequel, 2010: The Year We Make Contact. His other film roles include David and Lisa (1962), Bunny Lake Is Missing (1965) and Black Christmas (1974). Dullea studied acting at the Neighborhood Playhouse School of the Theatre in New York City. He has also performed on stage in New York City and in regional theaters; he has said that, despite being more recognized for his film work, he prefers the stage.

Biography
Early life
Dullea was born in Cleveland, Ohio, the son of Margaret (née Ruttan) and Robert Dullea. His mother was of Scottish descent, and his father was a second-generation Irish-American. He was raised in the Greenwich Village section of New York City, where his parents ran a bookstore. He graduated from George School in Pennsylvania, attended Rutgers University and San Francisco State University, then pursued an acting career.

Career

Early career
Dullea made his debut in a television adaptation of Mrs. Miniver (1960) with Maureen O'Hara, playing the German pilot. He was also in the TV movies Give Us Barabbas! (1961) and an adaptation of All Summer Long (1961).

He was in demand for guest appearances on television shows such as Route 66, The New Breed, Checkmate and Cain's Hundred.

Dullea made his film debut in 1961 in  Hoodlum Priest, cast on the strength of his work on Route 66.

His performance was well received. Metro-Goldwyn-Mayer and Disney offered long-term contracts (roles in Two Weeks in Another Town and Bon Voyage) but Dullea turned both down. He did accept a non-exclusive contract with Seven Arts and shot a pilot for a series that was not picked up. He appeared in Los Angeles on stage in The Short Happy Life.

David and Lisa
In 1962, he starred with Janet Margolin in David and Lisa, a film based on the book by Theodore Isaac Rubin, M.D., a psychiatrist who treated the two mentally ill adolescents portrayed in the film.  It was a low-budget film that became a break out hit, making over $2 million, and turning Dullea into an established name. Film Daily voted him "find of the year".

Dullea appeared on television in shows such as Empire, The United States Steel Hour, Bonanza, Naked City, Going My Way, The Eleventh Hour, Alcoa Premiere, Kraft Mystery Theater and  Channing.

Dullea was second billed in Mail Order Bride (1964), written and directed by Burt Kennedy.

He starred in the first screen adaptation of James Jones' The Thin Red Line (1964), then did a TV adaptation of Pale Horse, Pale Rider and went to Italy to star in The Naked Hour (1964).

In 1965, he guest-starred as Lieutenant Kurt Muller in the episode titled "To Heinie, with Love" of Twelve O'Clock High. He took these roles to avoid being typecast as a troubled youth. Dullea went to England to make Bunny Lake Is Missing (1965), which co-starred Dullea with Laurence Olivier, Carol Lynley, and Noël Coward. Although they shared no scenes together in the film, when Coward initially met Dullea on the set, he uttered the often quoted line "Keir Dullea, gone tomorrow." Nonetheless he was voted one of 1965's "stars of tomorrow".

Dullea played the son of Lana Turner's character in Ross Hunter's remake of Madame X (1966), which underperformed commercially. He then appeared with Anne Heywood and Sandy Dennis in the Canadian box office hit, The Fox (1967).

His first Broadway appearance was in 1967 in Ira Levin's Dr. Cook's Garden with Burl Ives, which only had a short run.

 Kubrick and Later

2001: A Space Odyssey 
In 1968, Dullea appeared as astronaut David Bowman in Stanley Kubrick's film 2001: A Space Odyssey, which became a box-office success and is recognized by critics, filmmakers and audiences as one of the greatest and most influential films ever made. His line "Open the pod bay doors please, HAL" is #78 on the American Film Institute's list of 100 movie quotes.

Dullea was offered the title role in movie De Sade (1969), playing the title role (the Marquis de Sade). The movie was a critical and commercial disappointment despite a cast that included John Huston.

Dullea had success on Broadway, starring in the 1969 hit comedy Butterflies Are Free with Eileen Heckart and Blythe Danner. In the play, he introduced the title song written by Stephen Schwartz (later recording the tune on an album for Platypus Records). The play was a huge hit, running for 1,128 performances, although Dullea did not appear in the film version.

London
Dullea travelled to London to be in the production of Butterflies there and decided to stay. He did a series of TV movies, Black Water Gold (1970), Montserrat (1971), and A Kiss Is Just a Kiss (1971).

He did a thriller in Italy, Devil in the Brain (1972), and guest starred on McMillan & Wife.

Canada

Dullea worked in Canada on the film Paperback Hero (1973) and worked in that country for a number of years. He had the lead role in a Canadian TV series The Starlost (1973) but it only ran 18 episodes.

He was a regular vocal performer on CBS Radio Mystery Theater, which ran from 1974 to 1982.

Dullea was in Paul and Michelle (1974) and had a major role in the Canadian production, 1974 cult classic Black Christmas as Peter Smythe, Jess Bradford’s boyfriend.

In 1974, he played Brick in the Tennessee Williams classic Cat on a Hot Tin Roof opposite Elizabeth Ashley and Fred Gwynne on Broadway which ran 160 performances. The production featured the now definitive rewrite of the play.

He also starred in the 1975 play P.S. Your Cat Is Dead. Dullea was one of the last people to see actor Sal Mineo alive. The two were rehearsing for the play on the night of Mineo's murder.

He appeared in Law and Order (1976) for TV, the Canadian movies Welcome to Blood City (1977), The Haunting of Julia (1977), and Three Dangerous Ladies (1977), the British Leopard in the Snow (1977), the Australian Because He's My Friend (1978), and some films for TV: The Legend of the Golden Gun (1978), an adaptation of Brave New World (1980), The Hostage Tower (1980), No Place to Hide (1981), and BrainWaves (1982).

Westport
In 1981, Dullea moved to Westport, Connecticut.

In 1982, Dullea starred in an off-Broadway production of  Sweet Prince under the direction of his wife Susie Fuller. The following year, the couple co-founded the Theater Artists Workshop of Westport.

Dullea appeared as a regular cast member in the Canadian soap opera Loving Friends and Perfect Couples, which ran in 1983. He was in Blind Date (1984) and The Next One (1984).

2010
In 1984, he reprised his role as David Bowman in 2010: The Year We Make Contact, Peter Hyams' sequel to 2001. 2010 was nominated for five Academy Awards.

In July 1984, Dullea was guest artist aboard the ocean liner Queen Elizabeth 2. On July 11, he performed Anton Chekhov's one-act play The Harmfulness of Tobacco in the QE2 Theatre.

He returned to Broadway when he joined the cast of the successful Doubles (1985–86).

He toured with a theatre show Keir Dullea and Friends (1988).

In 1990 he said "My career has a lot to do with choices I made in my life. My focus over the last, oh, at least 10 years has been the theater. I really haven't made very much effort with films. I did more than 20 plays before I ever did The Hoodlum Priest, and (after that) I've done more than 20 films... It wasn't as if the industry had fired me; I had just made certain life decisions I suddenly was having to pay the piper for. So there was no film career at all. I'm always working (in theater). If I'm not engaged on stage in something, I'm working with my wife on another project. I no longer live my life waiting for my phone to ring to give me permission to work."
 
He did The Servant on stage in 1990.

He was in Oh, What a Night (1992) and played F. Scott Fitzgerald off Broadway in The Other Side of Paradise (1992).

In 2000, he appeared in The Audrey Hepburn Story as Hepburn's father Joseph. That year he was also in Songs in Ordinary Time (2000), and episodes of Witchblade, Ed, Law & Order: Special Victims Unit and Law and Order.

In summer 2002, he performed in the Washington Shakespeare Theatre's production of The Little Foxes.  And the following year he could be seen in Alien Hunter (2003).

In December 2004, for their annual birthday celebration to "The Master", the Noël Coward Society invited Dullea as the guest celebrity to lay flowers in front of Coward's statue at New York's Gershwin Theatre, thereby commemorating the 105th birthday of Sir Noël. Around the same time, Sony Home Video released Bunny Lake Is Missing for the first time on DVD.

In 2006, he played Andrew Keener in Cost of Capital,  which was the 16th episode, of the 16 season of the original Law & Order American television series, and he had a role as a US Senator and a "major influence and mentor" to Matt Damon's character, in Robert De Niro's film The Good Shepherd (2006). He was the narrator in an off Broadway production of Mary Rose (2007).

Later career
Dullea was in The Accidental Husband (2009), All Me, All the Time (2009), Castle, Fortune (2009), and Damages.

In April 2010, Dullea performed the role of Tom Garrison in the off-Broadway production of the Robert Anderson play, I Never Sang for My Father co-starring Oscar-nominated actress Marsha Mason (as Margaret Garrison) and film and stage actor Matt Servitto (as Gene Garrison).

In October 2012, Dullea performed the role of Heinrich Mann in the Guthrie Theater production of Tales from Hollywood by Christopher Hampton.

He was in Isn't It Delicious (2013) with his wife Mia Dillon, Infinitely Polar Bear (2014), Space Station 76 (2014), and April Flowers (2017).

During August and September 2013, Keir Dullea starred as Big Daddy in Cat on a Hot Tin Roof, playing opposite wife Mia Dillon in a joint production for Wellfleet Harbor Actors Theater and Provincetown Tennessee Williams Theater Festival.

Between July 10-August 2, 2015, Dullea and wife Mia Dillon were joined by Todd Cerveris, Cameron Clifford, Don Noble and Christa Scott-Reed in the Bucks County Playhouse production of Ernest Thompson's On Golden Pond.

He had a regular role in The Path (2014–16) and could be seen in Fahrenheit 451 (2018).

Personal life
Dullea has been married four times, first to stage and film actress Margot Bennett from 1960 until their divorce in 1968. He was married from 1969 to 1970 to Susan Lessons. In 1972, Dullea married Susie Fuller, who had two daughters from a previous relationship. The couple met during the London run of Butterflies Are Free. Dullea, Fuller and her children lived in London for several years. She died in 1998 after 26 years of marriage. In 1999, Dullea married actress Mia Dillon. They divide their time between an apartment in Manhattan and a house in Connecticut.

FilmographyTelevisionRadio appearances

Awards and nominationsBAFTA Awards1964: Nominated, "Most Promising Newcomer to Leading Film Roles" – David and LisaGolden Globe Awards1962: Won, "Most Promising Male Newcomer"Laurel Awards1963: Nominated, "Top New Male Personality"San Francisco International Film Festival1962: Won''', "Best Actor" – David and Lisa''

References

Further reading

External links
 
 
 
 Keir Dullea at the University of Wisconsin's Actors Studio audio collection

1936 births
20th-century American male actors
21st-century American male actors
American male film actors
American male stage actors
American male television actors
American people of Scottish descent
American people of Irish descent
Living people
Male actors from Cleveland
Rutgers University alumni
San Francisco State University alumni
George School alumni
New Star of the Year (Actor) Golden Globe winners